The 2022–23 Formosa Taishin Dreamers season was the franchise's 6th season, its third season in the P. LEAGUE+ (PLG). The Dreamers are coached by Kyle Julius in his fourth year as head coach.

Draft 

The Dreamers' 2022 first-round draft pick and Chieng Li-Huan was traded to Taoyuan Pilots in exchange for Lin Yao-Tsung and Wu Chia-Chun. The Dreamers doesn't select any players in the draft.

Standings

Roster

Game log

Be Heroes Changhua Classic Basketball

Preseason 

|-style="background:#cfc"
| 1
| October 8
| @Lioneers
| W 115–100
| Malcolm Miller (35)
| Brandon Gilbeck (11)
| Wu Chia-Chun (6)
| Fengshan Arena4,205
| 1–0
|-style="background:#cfc"
| 2
| October 9
| Pilots
| W 108–88
| Sir'Dominic Pointer (21)
| Brandon Gilbeck (8)
| Lin Chun-Chi (5)
| Fengshan Arena3,668 || 2–0

Regular season 

|-style="background:#cfc"
| 1
| November 12
| Steelers
| W 84–76
| Malcolm Miller (30)
| Malcolm Miller (14)
| Lu Kuan-Liang (5)
| Intercontinental Basketball Stadium3,000 || 1–0
|-style="background:#fcc"
| 2
| November 13
| Braves
| L 75–108
| Malcolm Miller (19)
| Malcolm Miller (8)
| Wu Yung-Sheng (3)
| Intercontinental Basketball Stadium3,000
| 1–1
|-style="background:#fcc"
| 3
| November 19
| Kings
| L 89–101
| Brandon Gilbeck (19)
| Malcolm Miller (10)
| Wu Yung-Sheng (5)
| Intercontinental Basketball Stadium3,000
| 1–2
|-style="background:#cfc"
| 4
| November 20
| Pilots
| W 88–77
| Sir'Dominic Pointer (20)
| Brandon Gilbeck (9)
| Lin Chun-Chi (7)
| Intercontinental Basketball Stadium3,000
| 2–2
|-style="background:#cfc"
| 5
| November 27
| @Kings
| W 102–82
| Brandon Gilbeck (34)
| Brandon Gilbeck (22)
| Lin Chun-Chi (5)
| Xinzhuang Gymnasium3,320
| 3–2

|-style="background:#fcc"
| 6
| December 3
| @Lioneers
| L 77–82
| Lin Chun-Chi (22)
| Brandon Gilbeck (16)
| Kenneth Chien (4)
| Hsinchu County Stadium4,748
| 3–3
|-style="background:#fcc"
| 7
| December 6
| Braves
| L 87–90
| Brandon Gilbeck (26)
| Brandon Gilbeck (16)
| Douglas Creighton (8)
| Intercontinental Basketball Stadium3,000
| 3–4
|-style="background:#cfc"
| 8
| December 11
| @Braves
| W 97–94
| Brandon Gilbeck (25)
| Brandon Gilbeck (20)
| Wu Chia-Chun (6)
| Taipei Heping Basketball Gymnasium6,138
| 4–4
|-style="background:#fcc"
| 9
| December 18
| @Pilots
| L 80–84
| Lin Chun-Chi (22)
| Brandon Gilbeck (14)
| Wu Chia-Chun (4)
| Taoyuan Arena2,283
| 4–5
|-style="background:#cfc"
| 10
| December 24
| Steelers
| W 117–94
| Lin Chun-Chi (31)
| Sir'Dominic Pointer (14)
| Sir'Dominic Pointer (5)
| Intercontinental Basketball Stadium2,876
| 5–5
|-style="background:#fcc"
| 11
| December 25
| Kings
| L 90–99
| Lin Chun-Chi (18)
| Brandon Gilbeck (13)
| Pointer, Wu Y. (4)
| Intercontinental Basketball Stadium3,000
| 5–6
|-style="background:#fcc"
| 12
| December 31
| @Lioneers
| L 97–102
| Brandon Gilbeck (27)
| Brandon Gilbeck (14)
| Faust ,Lin C. (6)
| Hsinchu County Stadium5,247
| 5–7

|-style="background:#fcc"
| 13
| January 8
| @Steelers
| L 88–105
| Sir'Dominic Pointer (23)
| Brandon Gilbeck (14)
| Lin Chun-Chi (4)
| Fengshan Arena1,988
| 5–8
|-style="background:#fcc"
| 14
| January 13
| @Lioneers
| L 80–87
| Sir'Dominic Pointer (24)
| Brandon Gilbeck (11)
| Wu Yung-Sheng (6)
| Hsinchu County Stadium3,914
| 5–9
|-style="background:#fcc"
| 15
| January 15
| @Pilots
| L 76–93
| Brandon Gilbeck (18)
| Brandon Gilbeck (10)
| Lin Chun-Chi (6)
| Taoyuan Arena3,868
| 5–10
|-style="background:#cfc"
| 16
| January 28
| Lioneers
| W 123–99
| Lu Kuan-Liang (28)
| Brandon Gilbeck (14)
| Lin Chun-Chi (6)
| Intercontinental Basketball Stadium3,000
| 6–10
|-style="background:#fcc"
| 17
| January 29
| Kings
| L 73–90
| Sir'Dominic Pointer (20)
| Sir'Dominic Pointer (17)
| Sir'Dominic Pointer (5)
| Intercontinental Basketball Stadium3,000
| 6–11

|-style="background:#cfc"
| 18
| February 3
| @Steelers
| W 106–101
| Sir'Dominic Pointer (34)
| Brandon Gilbeck (14)
| Lin Chun-Chi (6)
| Fengshan Arena1,536
| 7–11
|-style="background:#fcc"
| 19
| February 5
| @Braves
| L 75–90
| Sir'Dominic Pointer (30)
| Ilkan Karaman (10)
| Lin C., Pointer (4)
| Taipei Heping Basketball Gymnasium5,604
| 7–12
|-style="background:#fcc"
| 20
| February 12
| @Steelers
| L 80–95
| Lin Chun-Chi (21)
| Brandon Gilbeck (11)
| Lin Chun-Chi (7)
| Fengshan Arena5,321
| 8–12
|-style="background:#cfc"
| 21
| February 17
| Pilots
| W 86–81
| Brandon Gilbeck (18)
| Brandon Gilbeck (15)
| Ilkan Karaman (6)
| Intercontinental Basketball Stadium2,618
| 9–12
|-style="background:#cfc"
| 22
| February 18
| Steelers
| W 102–91
| Ilkan Karaman (23)
| Ilkan Karaman (11)
| Lin Chun-Chi (7)
| Intercontinental Basketball Stadium3,000
| 9–13
|-style="background:#fcc"
| 23
| February 24
| @Braves
| L 87–91
| Gilbeck, Lin C. (18)
| Brandon Gilbeck (15)
| Lin Chun-Chi (5)
| Taipei Heping Basketball Gymnasium5,126
| 9–14
|-style="background:#cfc"
| 24
| February 26
| @Lioneers
| W 100–94
| Lee Te-Wei (22)
| Ilkan Karaman (16)
| Ilkan Karaman (7)
| Hsinchu County Stadium4,527
| 10–14

|-style="background:#cfc"
| 25
| March 5
| Lioneers
| W 111–93
| Ilkan Karaman (46)
| Ilkan Karaman (17)
| Lee, Lin C. (6)
| Intercontinental Basketball Stadium3,000
| 11–14
|-style="background:#fcc"
| 26
| March 7
| @Kings
| L 105–111
| Sir'Dominic Pointer (28)
| Sir'Dominic Pointer (12)
| Lin C., Pointer (6)
| Xinzhuang Gymnasium2,552
| 11–15
|-style="background:#fcc"
| 27
| March 11
| @Kings
| L 89–117
| Lin Chun-Chi (17)
| Chris McCullough (13)
| Lin Chun-Chi (5)
| Xinzhuang Gymnasium3,577
| 11–16
|-style="background:#cfc"
| 28
| March 18
| @Pilots
| W 85–77
| Lin Chun-Chi (21)
| Lee Te-Wei (13)
| Chien, Creighton (3)
| Taoyuan Arena2,073
| 12–16
|-
| 29
| March 24
| Kings
| 
| 
| 
| 
| Intercontinental Basketball Stadium
| 
|-
| 30
| March 26
| Lioneers
| 
| 
| 
| 
| Intercontinental Basketball Stadium
| 

|-
| 31
| April 1
| Braves
| 
| 
| 
| 
| Intercontinental Basketball Stadium
| 
|-
| 32
| April 2
| Steelers
| 
| 
| 
| 
| Intercontinental Basketball Stadium
| 
|-
| 33
| April 9
| @Pilots
| 
| 
| 
| 
| Taoyuan Arena
| 
|-
| 34
| April 15
| Lioneers
| 
| 
| 
| 
| Intercontinental Basketball Stadium
| 
|-
| 35
| April 16
| Pilots
| 
| 
| 
| 
| Intercontinental Basketball Stadium
| 
|-
| 36
| April 22
| @Braves
| 
| 
| 
| 
| Taipei Heping Basketball Gymnasium
| 
|-
| 37
| April 29
| Braves
| 
| 
| 
| 
| Intercontinental Basketball Stadium
| 
|-
| 38
| April 30
| Pilots
| 
| 
| 
| 
| Intercontinental Basketball Stadium
| 

|-
| 39
| May 6
| @Kings
| 
| 
| 
| 
| Xinzhuang Gymnasium
| 
|-
| 40
| May 14
| @Steelers
| 
| 
| 
| 
| Fengshan Arena
|

Player Statistics 
<noinclude>

Regular season

‡ Waived during the season
≠ Acquired during the season

Transactions

Overview

Trades

Free Agency

Additions

Subtractions

Awards

Players of the Week

Notes

References 

Formosa Taishin Dreamers seasons
Formosa Taishin Dreamers